Chorisops is a genus of flies in the family Stratiomyidae.

Species
Chorisops bilobata Li, Cui & Yang, 2009
Chorisops brevis Li, Cui & Yang, 2009
Chorisops caroli Troiano, 1995
Chorisops fanjingshana Li, Cui & Yang, 2009
Chorisops longa Li, Zhang & Yang, 2009
Chorisops maculiala Nagatomi, 1964
Chorisops marginata Frey, 1960
Chorisops masoni Troiano & Toscano, 1995
Chorisops nagatomii Rozkošný, 1979
Chorisops separata Yang & Nagatomi, 1992
Chorisops striata Qi, Zhang & Yang, 2011
Chorisops tianmushana Li, Zhang & Yang, 2009
Chorisops tibialis (Meigen, 1820)
Chorisops tunisiae (Becker, 1915)
Chorisops unita Yang & Nagatomi, 1992
Chorisops zhangae Li, Zhang & Yang, 2009

References

Stratiomyidae
Brachycera genera
Taxa named by Camillo Rondani
Diptera of Europe
Diptera of Asia